Ahmed Abdu Jaber (born 8 August 1996) is an Eritrean professional footballer who plays as a striker for Pro League side Al-Shabab.

References

External links

1996 births
Living people
Sportspeople from Jeddah
Eritrean footballers
Association football forwards
Saudi First Division League players
Saudi Professional League players
Al-Fayha FC players
Al-Riyadh SC players
Al-Adalah FC players
Al-Tai FC players
Al-Wehda Club (Mecca) players
Al-Shabab FC (Riyadh) players